The 2023 Louisiana–Monroe Warhawks football team will represent the University of Louisiana at Monroe as a member of the West Division of the Sun Belt Conference during the 2023 NCAA Division I FBS football season. Led by third-year head coach Terry Bowden, Louisiana–Monroe are set to play their home games at Malone Stadium in Monroe, Louisiana.

Previous season

The Warhawks compiled an overall record of 4–8 with a mark of 3–5 in conference play, placing fifth in the Sun Belt's West Division.

Schedule
The football schedule was announced February 24, 2023.

References

Louisiana–Monroe
Louisiana–Monroe Warhawks football seasons
Louisiana–Monroe Warhawks football